Jim Donnelly (24 June 1906 – 2 March 1978) was an Australian cricketer. He played three first-class matches for New South Wales between 1929/30 and 1931/32.

See also
 List of New South Wales representative cricketers

References

External links
 

1906 births
1978 deaths
Australian cricketers
New South Wales cricketers
People from the South Coast (New South Wales)
Cricketers from New South Wales